Moncada can refer to:

Places 
 Moncada, Tarlac, a municipality (3rd class) in the Philippines
 Moncada, Valencia, a municipality in Spain
 Moncada, a community of Santiago de Cuba
 Moncada Barracks, named after Guillermon, notably attacked in 1953 at the start of the Cuban Revolution
 Moncada (novel) (Moncada, premier combat de Fidel Castro), a 1965 novel by Robert Merle
Estadio Guillermón Moncada, stadium named in his honour
 La Moncada, a small town in the municipality of Tarimoro, Guanajuato, Mexico
  in Caltanissetta, Sicily

People 
 Eduardo Hernández Moncada (1899–1995), Mexican composer, pianist, and conductor
 Freddy Moncada (born 1973), Colombian road cyclist
 Gerardo Moncada (cyclist) (born 1962), Colombian road cyclist
 Gerardo Moncada (footballer) (born 1949), Colombian former footballer
 Guillermon Moncada, a Cuban general and folkhero
 Jesús Moncada (1941–2005), writer in Catalan
 José María Moncada, (1870–1945), former President of Nicaragua 
 Salvador Moncada (born 1944), Honduran scientist
 Samuel Moncada, Venezuelan historian and Minister of Foreign Affairs
 Yoan Moncada (born 1995), Cuban baseball player
 House of Moncada, noble medieval family originating in Catalonia